Sigurðarkviða ("lay of Sigurd") may refer to:
Sigurðarkviða hin skamma
 Brot af Sigurðarkviðu
Grípisspá ( Sigurðarkviða Fáfnisbana I)
Reginsmál (a.k.a. Sigurðarkviða Fáfnisbana II)

See also
Völsunga saga